Hector Xavier Monsegur (born 1983), known also by the online pseudonym Sabu (pronounced Sə'buː, Sæ'buː), is an American computer hacker and co-founder of the hacking group LulzSec. Monsegur became an informant for the FBI, working with the agency for over ten months to aid them in identifying the other hackers from LulzSec and related groups while facing a sentence of 124 years in prison. LulzSec intervened in the affairs of organizations such as News Corporation, Stratfor, UK and American law enforcement bodies and Irish political party Fine Gael.

Sabu featured prominently in the group's published IRC chats, and claimed to support the "Free Topiary" campaign. The Economist referred to Sabu as one of LulzSec's six core members.

Identity
Sabu was identified by Backtrace Security as "Hector Monsegur" on March 11, 2011, in a PDF publication titled "Namshub".

On June 25, 2011, an anonymous Pastebin post claimed that Sabu was Hector Xavier Monsegur, a man of Puerto Rican origin.

At the time of his arrest, Xavier was a 28-year-old unemployed foster parent of his two female cousins, who were the children of Sabu's incarcerated aunt. Sabu attended, but did not graduate from, Washington Irving High School. He had been living in his late grandmother's apartment in the Riis Houses in New York City.

Arrest and activity as an informant for the FBI
Federal agents arrested Monsegur on June 7, 2011. The following day, Monsegur agreed to become an informant for the FBI and to continue his "Sabu" persona. "Since literally the day he was arrested, the defendant has been cooperating with the government proactively," sometimes staying up all night engaging in conversations with co-conspirators to help the government build cases against them, Assistant U.S. Attorney James Pastore said at a secret bail hearing on August 5, 2011. A few days after that bail hearing, Monsegur entered a guilty plea to 12 criminal charges, including multiple counts of conspiracy to engage in computer hacking, computer hacking in furtherance of fraud, conspiracy to commit access device fraud, conspiracy to commit bank fraud and aggravated identity theft. He faced up to 124 years in prison.

As an informant, Monsegur provided the FBI with details enabling the arrest of five other hackers associated with the groups Anonymous, LulzSec and AntiSec. The FBI provided its own servers for the hacking to take place. Information Monsegur provided also resulted in the arrest of two UK hackers: James Jeffery and Ryan Cleary. The FBI attempted to use Monsegur to entrap Nadim Kobeissi, author of the secure communication software Cryptocat, but without success.

Monsegur maintained his pretense until March 6, 2012, even tweeting his "opposition" to the federal government until the very last minute. On March 6, 2012, the FBI announced the arrests of five male suspects: two from Britain, two from Ireland and one from the U.S. Anonymous reacted to Sabu's unmasking and betrayal of LulzSec on Twitter, "#Anonymous is a hydra, cut off one head and we grow two back".

A court filing made by prosecutors in late May 2014 revealed Monsegur had prevented 300 cyber attacks in the three years since 2011, including planned attacks on NASA, the U.S. military and media companies.

Monsegur served 7 months in prison after his arrest but had been free since then while awaiting sentencing. At his sentencing on May 27, 2014, he was given "time served" for co-operating with the FBI and set free under one year of probation. 

After his release from prison, Monsegur worked as a white hat hacker doing pentesting. He gives frequent talks with his former FBI handlers about his work with the FBI to entrap and arrest programmers and activists.

References

1983 births
American computer criminals
Anonymous (hacker group)
Federal Bureau of Investigation informants
Hackers
Living people
Washington Irving High School (New York City) alumni